Kevin Mullin (born June 15, 1970) is an American politician serving as the U.S. representative for California's 15th congressional district since 2023. A member of the Democratic Party, he served as a member of the California State Assembly from the 22nd district, which encompasses most of the San Francisco Peninsula region, from 2012 to 2022.

Mullin is the son of Gene Mullin, who served three terms in the Assembly. Before being elected to the Assembly in 2012, he was an entrepreneur and served on the city council of South San Francisco, including one year as mayor. He served as speaker pro tempore of the Assembly from 2014 to 2022.

Early life and education 
Mullin was born in Daly City, California, on June 15, 1970. He attended public and Catholic elementary schools before graduating from Junípero Serra High School in 1988. He received a bachelor's degree in communications from the University of San Francisco in 1992, and a master of public administration from San Francisco State University in 1998. Additionally, Mullin completed an executive leadership program at Harvard University's Kennedy School of Government in 2003.

Early career

Business career 

Before entering politics, Mullin was a local business owner and district director to then-state senator Jackie Speier. He also served as political director for his father, then-state assemblymember Gene Mullin.

As an entrepreneur, Mullin founded KM2 Communications, a multimedia production business in South San Francisco. He produced public affairs programming on local television and hosted various programs on Peninsula-TV Channel 26.

South San Francisco City Council 

Mullin was elected to the South San Francisco City Council in 2007. He served one term on the council, including a one-year stint as mayor.

During his time on the council, Mullin also represented the cities of San Mateo County on the Metropolitan Transportation Commission.

California State Assembly 
Mullin was first elected to the Assembly in 2012. He represented the 22nd district, which encompassed most of the San Francisco Peninsula.

During his first term in the Assembly, Mullin served as assistant speaker pro tempore. He became speaker pro tempore of the Assembly in 2014, a position he held until leaving office in 2022. In this role, he regularly presided over Assembly floor sessions and continued as part of Anthony Rendon's leadership team.

Mullin left office on December 5, 2022. He was succeeded by Diane Papan.

U.S. House of Representatives

Elections

2022 

Following Speier's retirement, Mullin announced his candidacy to succeed her in the 2022 election. He defeated San Mateo County supervisor David Canepa with 55.8% of the vote.

Mullin was sworn into the House of Representatives on January 7, 2023 when the 118th Congress convened.

Mullin was placed on the House Committee on Natural Resources and the Committee on Science, Space, and Technology in the 118th Congress.

Personal life
Mullin is married to Jessica Stanfill Mullin, with whom he has twin sons. They live in South San Francisco.

Electoral history

2014 California State Assembly

2016 California State Assembly

2018 California State Assembly

2020 California State Assembly

2022 California Congressional election

References

External links 

 Congressman Kevin Mullin official U.S. House website
 Kevin Mullin for Congress campaign website
 

|-

|-

1970 births
21st-century American politicians
Democratic Party members of the California State Assembly
Democratic Party members of the United States House of Representatives from California
Junípero Serra High School (San Mateo, California) alumni
Living people
People from South San Francisco, California
San Francisco Bay Area politicians